Kumaramputhur may refer to

 Kumaramputhur, a village in the  Kumaramputhur (gram panchayat), Palakkad district, state of Kerala, India.

 Kumaramputhur (gram panchayat), a gram panchayat that serves the above village and others.